Several factors complicate the diagnosis of Asperger syndrome (AS), an autism spectrum disorder (ASD). Like other ASD forms, Asperger syndrome is characterized by impairment in social interaction accompanied by restricted and repetitive interests and behavior; it differs from the other ASDs by having no general delay in language or cognitive development. Problems in diagnosis include disagreement among diagnostic criteria, the controversy over the distinction between AS and other ASD forms or even whether AS exists as a separate syndrome, and over- and under-diagnosis for non-technical reasons. As with other ASD forms, early diagnosis is important, and differential diagnosis must consider several other conditions.

Criteria

Asperger syndrome is defined in the Diagnostic and Statistical Manual of Mental Disorders (DSM-IV-TR) as a pervasive developmental disorder that is distinguished by a pattern of symptoms rather than a single symptom. It is characterized by impairment in social interaction, by stereotyped and restricted patterns of behavior, activities and interests, and by no clinically significant delay in cognitive development or general delay in language. Impairments must be significant, and must affect important areas of function, and the diagnosis is excluded if criteria are also met for autism. Intense preoccupation with a narrow subject, one-sided verbosity, restricted prosody, and physical clumsiness are typical of the condition, but are not required for diagnosis.

The World Health Organization ICD-10 criteria are almost identical to DSM-IV: ICD-10 adds the statement that motor clumsiness is usual (although not necessarily a diagnostic feature); ICD-10 adds the statement that isolated special skills, often related to abnormal preoccupations, are common but are not required for diagnosis; and the DSM-IV requirement for clinically significant impairment in social, occupational, or other important areas of functioning is not included in ICD-10.

Diagnosis of Asperger syndrome can be tricky as there is a lack of standardized diagnostic screening for the disorder. According to the US National Institute of Neurological Disorders and Stroke, physicians look for the presence of a primary group of behaviors to make a diagnosis such as abnormal eye contact, aloofness, failure to respond when called by name, failure to use gestures to point or show, lack of interactive play with others, and a lack of interest in peers.

Reliability

The diagnoses of AS or high-functioning autism (HFA) are sometimes used interchangeably; the same child can receive different diagnoses depending on the screening tool and the individual administering the test. Diagnoses may be influenced by non-technical issues, such as the availability of government benefits for one condition but not the other.  Advocacy and parent support organizations have proliferated around the concept of AS, and there are indications that this has resulted in more frequent diagnoses of AS, which may be given as a "residual diagnosis" to children of normal intelligence who do not meet diagnostic criteria for autism but have some social difficulties.
Conversely, the cost of screening and diagnosis and the challenge of obtaining payment can inhibit or delay diagnosis.

Procedure

Developmental screening during a routine check-up by a general practitioner or pediatrician may identify signs that warrant further investigation. This will require a comprehensive team evaluation to either confirm or exclude a diagnosis of AS. This team usually includes a psychologist, neurologist, psychiatrist, speech and language pathologist, occupational therapist and other professionals with expertise in diagnosing children with AS.  Observation occurs across multiple settings; the social disability in AS may be more evident during periods when social expectations are unclear and children are free of adult direction. A comprehensive evaluation includes neurological and genetic assessment, with in-depth cognitive and language testing to establish IQ and evaluate psychomotor function, verbal and nonverbal strengths and weaknesses, style of learning, and skills for independent living. An assessment of communication strengths and weaknesses includes the evaluation of nonverbal forms of communication (gaze and gestures); the use of non-literal language (metaphor, irony, absurdities and humor); patterns of speech inflection, stress and volume; pragmatics (turn-taking and sensitivity to verbal cues); and the content, clarity and coherence of conversation.  Testing may include an audiological referral to exclude hearing impairment. The determination of whether there is a family history of autism spectrum conditions is important.  A medical practitioner will diagnose on the basis of the test results and the person's developmental history and current symptoms. Because multiple domains of functioning are involved, a multidisciplinary team approach is critical; an accurate assessment of the individual's strengths and weaknesses is more useful than a diagnostic label. Delayed or mistaken diagnosis is a serious problem that can be traumatic for individuals and families; diagnosis based solely on neurological, speech and language, or educational attainment may yield only a partial diagnosis.

Advances in genetic technology allow clinical geneticists to link an estimated 40% of ASD cases to genetic causes; in one study the diagnostic yield for AS, PDD-NOS and atypical autism was similar to that for classic autism. Genetic diagnosis is relatively expensive, and genetic screening is generally impractical. As genetic tests are developed several ethical, legal, and social issues will emerge. Commercial availability of tests may precede adequate understanding of how to use test results, given the complexity of the genetics.

Early diagnosis

Parents of children with AS can typically trace differences in their children's development to as early as 30 months of age, although diagnosis is not made on average until the age of 11.  By definition, children with AS develop language and self-help skills on schedule, so early signs may not be apparent and the condition may not be diagnosed until later childhood or even old age.  Impairment in social interaction is sometimes not in evidence until a child attains an age at which these behaviors become important; social disabilities are often first noticed when children encounter peers in daycare or preschool.  Diagnosis is most commonly made between the ages of four and eleven, and one study suggests that diagnosis cannot be rendered reliably before age four.

Differential diagnosis

Asperger syndrome can be misdiagnosed as a number of other conditions, leading to medications that are unnecessary or even worsen behavior; the condition may be at the root of treatment-resistant mental illness in adults.  Diagnostic confusion burdens individuals and families and may cause them to seek unhelpful therapies.  Conditions that must be considered in a differential diagnosis include other pervasive developmental disorders (autism, PDD-NOS, childhood disintegrative disorder, Rett disorder), schizophrenia spectrum disorders (schizophrenia, schizotypal disorder, schizoid personality disorder), attention-deficit hyperactivity disorder, obsessive compulsive disorder, depression, semantic pragmatic disorder, multiple complex developmental disorder and nonverbal learning disorder (NLD).

Differentiating between AS and other ASDs relies on the judgment of experienced clinicians. There is much overlap between AS and NLD: both have symptoms of precocious reading, verbosity, and clumsiness, but they differ in that children with AS have restricted interests, repetitive behaviors, and less-typical social interactions. Tourette syndrome (TS) should also be considered in differential diagnosis:  "It is in nonretarded, rigid individuals on the autistic spectrum, especially those with so-called Asperger syndrome, that differences with less severely affected individuals with TS and obsessive compulsive disorder may become blurred, or that both disorders may coexist."
Other problems to be considered in the differential diagnosis include selective mutism, stereotypic movement disorder and bipolar disorder as well as traumatic brain injury or birth trauma, conduct disorder, Cornelia De Lange syndrome, fetal alcohol syndrome, fragile X syndrome, dyslexia, Fahr syndrome, hyperlexia, leukodystrophy, multiple sclerosis and Triple X syndrome.

Multiple sets of diagnostic criteria
The diagnosis of AS is complicated by the use of several different screening instruments.  In addition to the DSM-IV and the ICD-10 criteria, other sets of diagnostic criteria for AS are the Szatmari et al. criteria and the Gillberg and Gillberg criteria.

Compared with the DSM-IV and ICD-10 criteria, the requirements of normal early language and cognitive development are not mentioned by Szatmari et al., whereas language delay is allowed in the Gillberg and Gillberg criteria. Szatmari et al. emphasize solitariness, and both Gillberg and Szatmari include "odd speech" and "language" in their criteria.  Although Szatmari does not mention stereotyped behaviors, one of four described stereotyped functions is required by DSM-IV and ICD-10, and two are required by Gillberg and Gillberg.  Abnormal responses to sensory stimuli are not mentioned in any diagnostic scheme, although they have been associated with AS. Because DSM-IV and ICD-10 exclude speech and language difficulties, these definitions exclude some of the original cases described by Hans Asperger. According to one researcher, the majority of individuals with AS do have speech and language abnormalities, and the DSM-IV-TR says that "the occurrence of 'no clinically significant delays in language does not imply that individuals with Asperger Disorder have no problems with communication' (American Psychiatric Association, 2000, p. 80)". The Gillberg and Gillberg criteria are considered closest to Asperger's original description of the syndrome; the aggression and abnormal prosody that other authors say defined Asperger's patients are not mentioned in any criteria.

The DSM-IV and ICD-10 diagnostic criteria have been criticized for being too broad and inadequate for assessing adults, overly narrow (particularly in relation to Hans Asperger's original description of individuals with AS), and vague; results of a large study in 2007 comparing the four sets of criteria point to a "huge need to reconsider the diagnostic criteria of AS".  The study found complete overlap across all sets of diagnostic criteria in the impairment of social interaction with the exception of four cases not diagnosed by the Szatmari et al. criteria because of its emphasis on social solitariness.  Lack of overlap was strongest in the language delay and odd speech requirements of the Gillberg and the Szatmari requirements relative to DSM-IV and ICD-10, and in the differing requirements regarding general delays. A small 2008 study of children referred with a tentative diagnosis of AS found poor agreement among the four sets of criteria, with one overlap being only 39%. In 2007 Szatmari et al. suggested a new classification system of ASD based on familial traits found by genetic epidemiology.

Differences from high-functioning autism

The distinction between Asperger's and other ASD forms is to some extent an artefact of how autism was discovered. Although individuals with Asperger's tend to perform better cognitively than those with autism, the extent of the overlap between Asperger's and high-functioning autism is unclear.
Overall, relatively few differences are reported between Asperger's and autism on parameters related to causation. A standard assumption is that Asperger's and autism have a common cause, and are variable expressions of the same underlying disorder. A 2008 review of classification studies found that results largely did not support differences between the diagnoses, and that the most salient group characteristics came from IQ characterizations. The current ASD classification may not reflect the true nature of the conditions. A panel session at a 2008 diagnosis-related autism research planning conference noted problems with the classification of AS as a distinct subgroup of ASD, and two of three breakout groups recommended eliminating AS as a separate diagnosis.

A neuropsychological profile has been proposed for AS; if verified, it could differentiate between AS and HFA and aid in differential diagnosis. Relative to HFA, people with AS have deficits in nonverbal skills such as visual-spatial problem solving and visual-motor coordination, along with stronger verbal abilities. Several studies have found AS with a neuropsychologic profile of assets and deficits consistent with a nonverbal learning disability, but several other studies have failed to replicate this. The literature review did not reveal consistent findings of "nonverbal weaknesses or increased spatial or motor problems relative to individuals with HFA", leading some researchers to argue that increased cognitive ability is evidenced in AS relative to HFA regardless of differences in verbal and nonverbal ability.

DSM-5 changes 

The Diagnostic and Statistical Manual of Mental Disorders, Fifth Edition (DSM-5) which was published in May 2013 canceled Asperger's disorder as a separate diagnosis and homogenized it under autism spectrum disorder, with severity measures within the broader diagnosis. The DSM 5 noted that "Individuals with a well-established DSM-IV diagnosis of [...] Asperger's disorder [...] should be given the diagnosis of autism spectrum disorder."

The DSM 5 diagnostic criteria for Autism Spectrum Disorder states

A.   Persistent deficits in social communication and social interaction across multiple contexts, as manifested by the following, currently or by history (examples are illustrative, not exhaustive; see text):
Deficits in social-emotional reciprocity, ranging, for example, from abnormal social approach and failure of normal back-and-forth conversation; to reduced sharing of interests, emotions, or affect; to failure to initiate or respond to social interactions.

Deficits in nonverbal communicative behaviors used for social interaction, ranging, for example, from poorly integrated verbal and nonverbal communication; to abnormalities in eye contact and body language or deficits in understanding and use of gestures; to a total lack of facial expressions and nonverbal communication.

Deficits in developing, maintaining, and understanding relationships, ranging, for example, from difficulties adjusting behavior to suit various social contexts; to difficulties in sharing imaginative play or making friends; to absence of interest in peers.

B.    Restricted, repetitive patterns of behavior, interests, or activities, as manifested by at least two of the following, currently or by history (examples are illustrative, not exhaustive; see text):
Stereotyped or repetitive motor movements, use of objects, or speech (e.g., simple motor stereotypies, lining up toys or flipping objects, echolalia, idiosyncratic phrases).
Insistence on sameness, inflexible adherence to routines, or ritualized patterns of verbal or nonverbal behavior (e.g., extreme distress at small changes, difficulties with transitions, rigid thinking patterns, greeting rituals, need to take the same route or eat the same food every day).

Highly restricted, fixated interests that are abnormal in intensity or focus (e.g., strong attachment to or preoccupation with unusual objects, excessively circumscribed or perseverative interests).

Hyper- or hyporeactivity to sensory input or unusual interest in sensory aspects of the environment (e.g., apparent indifference to pain/temperature, adverse response to specific sounds or textures, excessive smelling or touching of objects, visual fascination with lights or movement).

Symptoms must be present in the early developmental period (but may not become fully manifest until social demands exceed limited capacities, or may be masked by learned strategies in later life).
Symptoms cause clinically significant impairment in social, occupational, or other important areas of current functioning.
These disturbances are not better explained by intellectual disability (intellectual developmental disorder) or global developmental delay. Intellectual disability and autism spectrum disorder frequently co-occur; to make comorbid diagnoses of autism spectrum disorder and intellectual disability, social communication should be below that expected for general developmental level.

The diagnosis is broken down into 3 levels of severity.

The removal of Asperger's Disorder from the DSM has been controversial as it is commonly used by health insurers, researchers, state agencies, schools, and individuals with the disorder. Experts are concerned that eliminating the Asperger's label will prevent mildly affected people from being evaluated for Autism. A meta-analysis of 14 studies published The Columbia University school of nursing in early 2014 showed that there was a pooled 30% decrease in Autism Spectrum Disorder diagnoses following the publication of the DSM 5.

References

Further reading 

 

Asperger syndrome
Psychiatric assessment